John McEwan was an American soccer player who earned two caps, scoring three goals, as a member of the U.S. national team in 1937.

College
McEwan attended Syracuse University where he was a two-year soccer letterman on the school’s soccer team. He was a co-captain and first team All American of the 1932 Orange Men team which went 4-2.

ASL
In 1935, McEwan scored nine goals for Brooklyn Celtic of the American Soccer League (ASL). That year, he was a member of an ASL All Star team which unofficially represented the U.S. in two games with Scotland. Scotland won the first game 4-1 and the second 5-1.  McEwan scored the ASL All Star goal in the second game.

National team
In 1937, McEwan was called up to the U.S. national team for three games with Mexico in Mexico City. Mexico won all three games, but McEwan scored a goal in both the September 12 and 19 losses.

References

American soccer players
American Soccer League (1933–1983) players
Brooklyn St. Mary's Celtic players
Syracuse Orange men's soccer players
United States men's international soccer players
Year of birth missing
Year of death missing

Association footballers not categorized by position